The Sack of Basra was the capture and looting of the Abbasid city of Basra by the Qarmatians of Bahrayn, and took place in August 923. It was the first of a series of Qarmatian attacks, that culminated in an invasion of Iraq in 927–928.

Background
In the 890s, the Isma'ili missionary Abu Sa'id al-Jannabi had established an independent Qarmatian state in Bahrayn. Under Abu Sa'id's rule, the Qarmatians of Bahrayn remained uninvolved in the Qarmatian uprisings of the 900s against the Abbasid Caliphate in Syria and Iraq, or in the establishment of the Fatimid Caliphate in Ifriqiya. Apart from a raid against Basra in 912, they also retained peace with the Abbasids, helped by donations of money and weapons by the Abbasid vizier, Ali ibn Isa ibn al-Jarrah. 

In January 923, Abu Sa'id's youngest son, Abu Tahir al-Jannabi, having reached the age of 16, succeeded to the leadership of the Qarmatians. At the same time, Ali ibn Isa lost his position, and was replaced by his more hawkish rival, Ibn al-Furat, who favoured military action. Abu Tahir, evidently ambitious to make his mark, likely took this as a pretext to attack the Abbasids.

Qarmatian sack of Basra
Barely four days after Ibn al-Furat's deposition, on 11 August 923, some 1,700 Qarmatians under Abu Tahir attacked Basra during the night. They used ladders to climb the walls, overpowered the gate guards and jammed the gates open with sand and stones so that they would not be trapped inside. Thinking that this was a Bedouin raid, the local governor, Sabuk al-Muflihi, went out with his men to meet the assailants without caution, and was killed. The Basrans resisted bravely, but without military support they were defeated. The Qarmatians pillaged the city unmolested for 17 days, carrying off much booty and many captives to be sold as slaves, including many women and children. 

Only after they had left did Abbasid troops arrive on the scene. This would be a common theme in the Abbasid military response to the Qarmatian raids: the Qarmatian raiding parties were small, but highly mobile, ensuring that any Abbasid military response would come late. At the same time, the Qarmatian base in Bahrayn was safe from Abbasid retaliation.

Aftermath
Rather than reacting to the Qarmatian threat, Ibn al-Furat was more concerned with securing his own position at court, exiling or torturing and killing many of his potential rivals. In March 924, however, the Qarmatians attacked the Hajj caravan making its way back from Mecca to Baghdad, overcame its escort, and took many of the pilgrims captive. The two events, which fell in the same Islamic year (311 AH), led chroniclers to label it the "year of destruction". Riots broke out in the streets of Baghdad against Ibn al-Furat, who now lost any support he might have had. On 16 July the vizier was deposed and executed, along with his son al-Muhassin. The event marked the final ascendance of the military over the civilian bureaucracy, with dire consequences for the future.

The Qarmatians continued attacking Hajj caravans over the following years, before setting out to a invasion of Iraq itself in 927, which at one point threatened Baghdad itself and ranged as far as Upper Mesopotamia. In 930, the Qarmatians would even sack and pillage Mecca, but due to internal troubles, the Qarmatian threat subsided, and peaceful relations were established between Bahrayn and the Abbasid Caliphate.

References

Sources
 
 
 
 
 

920s conflicts
923
10th century in Iraq
History of Basra
Battles involving the Abbasid Caliphate
Battles involving the Qarmatians